Hubballi-Dharwad Urban Development Authority (HDUDA) is a city planning authority responsible for planning functions and the principal planning authority of the Indian twin cities of Hubballi and Dharwad in Karnataka. It also oversees planning and development of infrastructure, provision of development-related sites and services, the housing needs of underprivileged citizens in Hubballi-Dharwad and is currently one of the largest government organisations in Karnataka.

History
HDUDA came into effect from 22-12-1987 by the Government notification under KUDA act - 1987. This authority combined in itself the planning functions of the erstwhile Planning authority and the developmental functions of the erstwhile CITB. Since inception HDUDA has allotted sites to the individuals for construction of residential dwellings. In addition, around 280 civic amenity sites have been allotted for use to various public organizations and offices, catering to the felt needs of the locality.

Projects
In 2015, HDUDA proposed comprehensive development plan to earmark land for establishment of 12 commercial hubs in Hubballi and Dharwad based on increasing the economic activities in the areas.

Departments
Departments under HDUDA as of 2023 are as follows 
Land Acquisition Department   
Town Planning Department
Engineering Department
Law Department
Allotment & General Administration Department
Finance Department

References

External links
 

Government of Dharwad